Sharon Acker (born April 2, 1935) is a Canadian film, stage, and television actress and model. Acker appeared mostly on television in Canada and the United States from 1956 to 1992. She played Della Street, Perry Mason's loyal secretary, in The New Perry Mason. Her film roles include Lucky Jim, Point Blank and Don't Let the Angels Fall.

Biography

Acker was born in Toronto, Ontario, adopted by Aileen and Ken Matthews of Toronto Canada. 

She began her professional acting career with a television appearance in a made-for-television movie of Anne of Green Gables. She joined the Stratford Theatre cast, and travelled with the troupe to England, where she stayed to seek acting work. She made her film debut there in Lucky Jim (1957).

Turning down a long-term contract with the producers of Lucky Jim, Acker returned to Canada in 1957 with her husband to raise a family.

Acker returned to acting in Canadian television productions. She appeared in a 1961 Canadian Broadcasting Corporation (CBC) production of Macbeth with Sean Connery, directed by Paul Almond. During the 1960s, she also modeled, appearing in print advertisements. She and Angie Dickinson were featured modeling "moll style" clothing in the August 25, 1967, issue of Life.

Her first American film appearance was in the John Boorman cult action film Point Blank (1967) starring Lee Marvin and John Vernon. From that point, Acker appeared in film and television roles in Canada and the United States. In 1969 she guest-starred in the Star Trek episode "The Mark of Gideon" as Odona, a young woman who chooses to sacrifice herself by introducing disease to her overpopulated planet. In 1976–77 she portrayed Helen Walling in the prime-time drama Executive Suite. She appeared in two roles in two episodes of The Rockford Files in 1978 and 1979. She made her last feature film appearance in 1981 and her last television appearance in 1992.

Acker married Peter Elkington, a filmmaker. She has two daughters from a previous marriage, and two daughters from Peter's previous marriage.

Filmography

Movies

Lucky Jim (1957) ... Christine Callaghan
Point Blank (1967) ... Lynne Walker
Waiting for Caroline (1969) ... Emily
The First Time (1969) ... Pamela Williams
Don't Let the Angels Fall (1969) ... Barbara
The Act of the Heart (1970) ... Adele
Happy Birthday to Me (1981) ... Estelle Wainwright
Threshold (1981) ... Tilla Vrain

Television

Anne of Green Gables (1956) ... Mrs. Stacey
The Unforeseen (1960)
Macbeth (1961) ... Lady Macduff
Wojeck (1966) (2 episodes) ... Tony Marlowe
The Wild Wild West "The Night of the Sedgewick Curse" (1968) ... Lavinia Sedgewick
Star Trek ("The Mark of Gideon") (1969)...Odona
It Takes a Thief (1968–1969) (three episodes) ... Dr. Edwina Hopkins
Lancer (1969) ... Tiffany Mumford
A Clear and Present Danger (1970 TV movie) ... Erin Stowe
The Bold Ones: The Senator (1970–1971) ... Ellen Stowe
Alias Smith and Jones (1971) ... Rachel Carlson
Cannon (TV series) (1971) ... Glinda Donaldson
Gunsmoke (1971) ... Tereese Farrell
The F.B.I. (1971)
Cade's County (1971) ... Roseann Claybourne
Love, American Style (1971)
Mission: Impossible (1972) ... Annette (1970) ... Connie Hastings
The Mod Squad (1972)
McMillan & Wife (1972) ... Evie Kendall
Hec Ramsey (1972) ... Nora Muldoon
The Delphi Bureau (1973) ... Sheila
The New Perry Mason (1973–1974) ... Della Street
Marcus Welby, M.D. (1973)
The Stranger (1973) ... Dr. Bettina Cooke
The Hanged Man (1974) ... Carrie Gault
Harry O (1974) ... Andrea Tannehill
Cannon (1975) ... Laura Venner (1974) ... Jill (1971) ... Mrs. Dude
Barnaby Jones (1975) ... Laura Vaner (1975) ... Florence Armstrong (1973) ... Gail Bloom
Our Man Flint: Dead on Target (1976)
Executive Suite (1976) ... Helen Walling
The Streets of San Francisco (1977) ... Ethel Finn (1975) ... Eleanor Jessup
The Hostage Heart (1977) ... Martha Lake
The Love Boat (1978) ... Evelyn
Matt and Jenny (1979) ... Samantha Shelborne
The Rockford Files (1978) Edie Nevitt ... (1979) Adrianna Danielli
Conquest of the Earth (1980)
Stone (1980)
Galactica 1980 (1980) ... Anne
Battles: The Murder That Wouldn't Die (1980 TV movie) ... Jill Spencer
The Incredible Hulk (1980) ... Dr. Louise Olson
Quincy, M.E. (1981) ... Allison Sirella/Mary Latham (1979) ... Fashion Designer Lynne Montgomery (1978) ... Barbara
Flamingo Road (1981)
Shannon (1981)
Off Your Rocker (1982 TV movie) ... Nurse Gloria
Texas (1982) ... Judith Wheeler
The Powers of Matthew Star (1983) ... Evita
Matt Houston (1983)
Trapper John, M.D. (1983) ... Senator Miriam Taylor
Whiz Kids (1984)
Simon & Simon (1985) ... Sandra Jefferson-Delaporte (1981) ... Helena Christian
Crazy Like a Fox (1985)
Knight Rider (1985) ... Sanford
You Again? (1986) ... Loretta Winslow
Murder, She Wrote (1986) episode "Keep the Home Fries Burning" ... Wilhelmina Fraser
Days of Our Lives (1987) ... Pamela Fouchier
Katts and Dog (1988) (3 episodes) ... Alice
Street Legal (1989) ... Jane Morrison
The Young and the Restless (1991–1992) ... Dr. Grace Sundell

References

External links
 
 

1935 births
Living people
Actresses from Toronto
Canadian film actresses
Canadian television actresses
20th-century Canadian actresses